"Fernando" is a song written by Benny Andersson and Björn Ulvaeus, from the Swedish musical group ABBA. The song was written for their fellow group member Anni-Frid Lyngstad and was included on her 1975 album Frida ensam.

The following year, "Fernando" was re-recorded by ABBA. It was released in March 1976 as the brand new track for the 1976 compilation album Greatest Hits, and was also included on the group's fourth studio album, Arrival, in Australia and New Zealand. "Fernando" is also featured on the multi-million-selling Gold: Greatest Hits compilation. The song is one of ABBA's best-selling singles of all time, with six million copies sold in 1976 alone. It is one of fewer than forty all-time singles to have sold 10 million (or more) physical copies worldwide, making it one of the best-selling singles of all time.

Background
"Fernando" was not originally released as an ABBA song but as a solo single by band member Anni-Frid Lyngstad. It was featured on her No. 1 Swedish solo album Frida ensam (1975). The song was composed by Benny Andersson and Björn Ulvaeus and carried the working title of "Tango". Preparations for recording began in August 1975. The writers made last-minute changes to the title before recording. The name "Fernando" was inspired by a bartender of that name who worked at a club the band frequented in Stockholm, Sweden.

Swedish-language version
The original Swedish-language version's lyrics were written by ABBA's manager Stig Anderson, and differ substantially from the English-language version. In the original, the narrator tries to console the heartbroken Fernando, who has lost his great love.

English-language version
The English version, with completely different lyrics by Björn Ulvaeus, presents a vision of nostalgia for two veterans reminiscing in old age about a long-ago battle in which they participated. "I wrote all the songs as little stories. 'Fernando' was about two old freedom-fighters from the Mexican Revolution. I was lying outside one summer night, looking at the stars and it suddenly came to me". "I knew that the title 'Fernando' had to be there, and after pondering a while, I had this vivid image in my mind of two old and scarred revolutionaries in Mexico sitting outside at night talking about old memories".

The B-side to "Fernando" was the song "Hey, Hey, Helen", a track from the group's self-titled third studio album (1975), although in some countries other tracks from the album were used instead, namely "Tropical Loveland", "Rock Me" or "Dance (While the Music Still Goes On)".

Spanish-language version
The title and rhythm of the song made it an obvious choice for inclusion on ABBA's Spanish album, Gracias Por La Música. The lyrics were translated into Spanish by Mary McCluskey and recorded at Polar Music Studio on 3 January 1980. The song was released as a promotional single in Spain.

Reception
"Fernando" was released in March 1976 and became one of ABBA's best-selling singles, topping the charts in at least 13 countries, and selling over 10 million copies worldwide. It was the longest-running No. 1 in Australian history (spending 14 weeks at the top and 40 weeks on the chart), and remained so for over 40 years, until it was surpassed by Ed Sheeran's "Shape of You", which achieved 15 weeks at No. 1 in May 2017. Prior to 1997, it was Australia's highest-selling single. "Fernando" also reached the top of the charts in Austria, Belgium, France, West Germany, the United Kingdom, Hungary, Ireland, Mexico, the Netherlands, New Zealand, South Africa and Switzerland. It was also a Top 5 hit in ABBA's native Sweden (although Lyngstad's version was No. 1 on Sweden's radio chart for nine weeks), Finland, Norway, Spain, Canada and Rhodesia.

The track became ABBA's fourth Top 20 hit on the U.S. Billboard Hot 100, peaking at No. 13. It also reached No. 1 on the Billboard Adult Contemporary chart, the first of two chart-toppers for ABBA on this chart (the second being "The Winner Takes It All"). The song remains an airplay staple on American radio stations specializing in the MOR, adult standards and easy listening formats.  Record World called the song "a classic!"

"Fernando" was the fourth-biggest single of 1976 in the UK. It spent 10 weeks in the UK Top 10 (more than any other ABBA single), and was also the second of three consecutive UK No. 1 singles for ABBA, after "Mamma Mia" and before "Dancing Queen". As of September 2021, it is ABBA's sixth-biggest song in the UK with 903,000 chart sales (pure sales and digital streams).

In Portugal the single sold 80,000 copies; in France it went to No. 1 and sold 850,000 copies.

The song was also chosen as the "Best Studio Recording of 1975", ABBA's first international prize.

Charts

Weekly charts

Year-end charts

Sales and certifications

Cher version

American singer and actress Cher recorded "Fernando," which was released as the third single from the movie soundtrack of Mamma Mia! Here We Go Again. Her version was released on 21 June 2018, by Capitol and Polydor Records. Produced by Benny Andersson, the song debuted on the Billboard Adult Contemporary chart in July 2018 at number 22. This cover version features background vocals by actor Andy García and also references the Mexico–Guatemala conflict of 1959, part of which had been seen by Cher's character, Ruby Sheridan, Donna's mother, along with her long lost love, Fernando Cienfuegos. Cher's solo cover version without background vocals by García appears on her 2018 ABBA tribute album Dancing Queen.

Critical reception
Writing for Idolator, Mike Wass felt that, in contrast to Cher's version of "Mamma Mia", which sounds "so playful and well-intentioned that it's impossible to resist," "Fernando" sounds "disarmingly faithful to the original, which is probably due to the fact it was co-produced by ABBA's own Benny Andersson. It has a warm, live feel that was so peculiar to ABBA's '70s fare and that sound really suits our heroine's soaring vocals."

Live performances
Cher performed "Fernando" at the CinemaCon 2018 to promote the Mamma Mia! Here We Go Again film. During her Here We Go Again Tour she also performs the song together with "Waterloo" and "SOS". On 31 October 2018 "The Shoop Shoop Song (It's in His Kiss)" and "Take Me Home" were cut from her Classic Cher concert residency and "Waterloo", "SOS" and "Fernando" were added.

Track listings and formats

Digital download
 "Fernando" (feat. Andy García) – 3:59
 "Fernando" (solo version) – 3:57

Charts

Appearances in other media
 ABBA perform parts of the song live in the film ABBA: The Movie (1977).
 The ABBA recording was featured in the films The Adventures of Priscilla, Queen of the Desert (1993) and Muriel's Wedding (1994).
 In 1976, the song was adapted, and performed by ABBA in this version, for use in a series of five television commercials promoting the National brand in Australia, used by the Matsushita Electric Industrial Co., Ltd.
 The song was featured prominently in Season 1, Episode 7 of "That '70s Show", both in the nightclub scene in which the original version plays and in the closing scene in which the characters Eric and Donna sing a portion of the song.
 The song was featured in the Season 2, Episode 6 of "Community", Epidemiology, where it can be heard playing in the library's PA System after Troy lowers the temperature on the thermostator, in an attempt to save the infected students.
 The song was featured in the “Malcolm in the Middle"  Season 1 finale "Water Park", as the background music for a dance scene between Dewey (Erik Per Sullivan) and his babysitter, Mrs. White (Bea Arthur).
 The song was featured in the Family Guy episode Cat Fight during a cutaway gag featuring a boy and a mounted moose head going on a date.

References

External links
 Background information on the making of the commercials, plus lyrics and voiceovers used

1975 songs
1976 singles
2018 singles
ABBA songs
Anni-Frid Lyngstad songs
Charo songs
Cher songs
Dutch Top 40 number-one singles
Irish Singles Chart number-one singles
Music videos directed by Lasse Hallström
Number-one singles in Australia
Number-one singles in Austria
Number-one singles in Belgium
Number-one singles in Germany
Number-one singles in New Zealand
Number-one singles in South Africa
Number-one singles in Switzerland
Polar Music singles
Songs about revolutions
Songs written by Benny Andersson and Björn Ulvaeus
Songs written by Stig Anderson
Swedish-language songs
UK Singles Chart number-one singles
Vikingarna (band) songs
Works about the Mexican Revolution